Kim Kang-min may refer to:
 Kim Kang-min (baseball)
 Kim Kang-min (actor)